Rennebu Church is a parish church of the Church of Norway in Rennebu municipality in Trøndelag county, Norway. It is located in the village of Voll, along the river Orkla. It is the main church for the Rennebu parish which is part of the Gauldal prosti (deanery) in the Diocese of Nidaros. The red, wooden church was built in a Y-shaped design in 1669 using plans drawn up by the architects Titus Bülche and Ole Jonsen Hindrum. It is the oldest of the four existing Y-shaped churches in Norway. The church seats about 292 people.

History

The earliest existing historical records of the church date back to the year 1297, but the church was not new that year. The first church in Rennebu was a stave church that was likely built during the 12th century. A preserved portal from the old stave church that is now in a museum is dated to approximately 1120-1150, meaning the church was likely constructed around that time.

After the new church was completed, the old stave church was torn down. Some of the interior furniture from the old stave church was reused in the new church. The church was originally only tarred on the outside, but later, the walls were paneled and painted red. The rare Y-shape of the building has three arms. The eastern arm contains the choir and sacristy. The other two arms were the nave. The southwestern arm had an entry porch attached and this was the main entrance to the church. In the 1870s, an entry porch was added to the northwestern arm as well. During the renovation of 1873–1881, the paneling on the outer walls was replaced, and the church exterior was painted white. In addition, the interior walls were clad with paneling, and a neo-Gothic cross partition, new benches, and pointed arched windows were installed. The church was restored in 1948-1952 under the leadership of John Tverdahl. During this restoration, it was brought back to its original design including the exterior red color. Inside the church, the wall paneling and the neo-Gothic cross partition were removed, the pulpit with ceiling was restored, the windows were changed and the church was given new pews.

See also
List of churches in Nidaros
1669 in Norway

References

Rennebu
Churches in Trøndelag
Y-shaped churches in Norway
Wooden churches in Norway
17th-century Church of Norway church buildings
Churches completed in 1669
12th-century establishments in Norway